St. Clair Pinckney (September 17, 1930 – February 1, 1999) was an American saxophonist who performed with James Brown as a member of the James Brown Orchestra and The J.B.'s. He played tenor and baritone saxophone.

Suffering from health issues for years, Pinckney left Brown's band in 1999.

Discography

Albums
 Private Stock - Ichiban Records – ICH 1036 (1989) 
 Do You Like It - Ichiban Records – ICH 1014 (1987)

Singles
 " Summer Breeze" / " Summer Breeze" Ichiban Records 129 (1988)
 "As We Lay" / "Last Train To Lakewood" - Ichiban Records 87 - 129
 "Do You Like It" / "As We Lay", "Shake You Down U" - Ichiban Records ICHT 701 (12")

References

External links 

1930 births
James Brown Orchestra members
The J.B.'s members
American saxophonists
American male saxophonists
1999 deaths
20th-century American musicians
20th-century saxophonists
20th-century American male musicians